This is a list of Aesop's Fables, a collection of fables attributed to the ancient Greek storyteller Aesop.

Aesop's Fables

Titles A–F

 Aesop and the Ferryman
 The Ant and the Grasshopper
 The Ape and the Fox
 The Ass and his Masters
 The Ass and the Pig
 The Ass Carrying an Image
 The Ass in the Lion's Skin
 The Astrologer who Fell into a Well
 The Bald Man and the Fly
 The Bear and the Travelers
 The Beaver
 The Belly and the Other Members
 The Bird-catcher and the Blackbird
 The Bird in Borrowed Feathers
 The Boy Who Cried Wolf
 The Bulls and the Lion
 The Cat and the Mice
 The Crab and the Fox
 The Cock and the Jewel
 The Cock, the Dog and the Fox
 The Crow and the Pitcher
 The Crow and the Sheep
 The Crow and the Snake
 The Deer without a Heart
 The Dog and Its Reflection
 The Dog and the Sheep
 The Dog and the Wolf
 The dogs and the lion's skin
 The Dove and the Ant
 The Eagle and the Beetle
 The Eagle and the Fox
 The Eagle Wounded by an Arrow
 The Farmer and his Sons
 The Farmer and the Sea
 The Farmer and the Stork
 The Farmer and the Viper
 The Fir and the Bramble
 The Fisherman and his Flute
 The Fisherman and the Little Fish
 The Fly and the Ant
 The Fly in the Soup
 The Fowler and the Snake
 The Fox and the Crow
 The Fox and the Grapes
 The Fox and the Lion
 The Fox and the Mask
 The Fox and the Sick Lion
 The Fox and the Stork
 The Fox and the Weasel
 The Fox and the Woodman
 The Fox, the Flies and the Hedgehog
 The Frightened Hares
 The Frog and the Fox
 The Frog and the Mouse
 The Frog and the Ox
 The Frogs and the Sun
 The Frogs Who Desired a King

Titles G–O

 The Grasshopper and the Ants
 The Goat and the Vine
 The Goose that Laid the Golden Eggs
 The Hare in flight
 Hercules and the Wagoner
 The Honest Woodcutter
 Horkos, the god of oaths
 The Horse and the Donkey
 The Horse that Lost its Liberty
 The Impertinent Insect
 The Jar of Blessings
 The Kite and the Doves
 The Lion and the Mouse
 The Lion Grown Old
 The Lion in Love
 The Lion's Share
 The Lion, the Bear and the Fox
 The lion, the boar and the vultures
 The Man and the Lion
 The Man with two Mistresses
 The Mischievous Dog
 The Miser and his Gold
 Momus criticizes the creations of the gods
 The Mountain in Labour
 The Mouse and the Oyster
 The North Wind and the Sun
 The Oak and the Reed
 The Old Man and Death
 The Old Man and his Sons
 The Old Man and the Ass
 The Old Woman and the Doctor
 The Old Woman and the Wine-jar
 The Oxen and the Creaking Cart

Titles R–Z

 The Rivers and the Sea
 The Rose and the Amaranth
 The Satyr and the Traveller
 The Shipwrecked Man and the Sea
 The Sick Kite
 The Snake and the Crab
 The Snake and the Farmer
 The Snake in the Thorn Bush
 The Statue of Hermes
 The Swan and the Goose
 The Tortoise and the Birds
 The Tortoise and the Hare
 The Town Mouse and the Country Mouse
 The Travellers and the Plane Tree
 The Trees and the Bramble
 The Trumpeter Taken Captive
 The Two Pots
 Venus and the Cat
 The Walnut Tree
 War and his Bride
 Washing the Ethiopian white
 The Wolf and the Crane
 The Wolf and the Lamb
 The Wolf and the Shepherds
 The Woodcutter and the Trees
 The Young Man and the Swallow
 Zeus and the Tortoise

Aesop's Fables
Aesop's Fables
Aesop's Fables